Son Young-ki (born 30 May 1985) is a South Korean foil fencer. He won several gold medals at the Asian Fencing Championships. During the 2019 World Fencing Championships he won a bronze medal.

References

External links

1985 births
Living people
South Korean male foil fencers
Fencers at the 2014 Asian Games
Fencers at the 2018 Asian Games
Asian Games gold medalists for South Korea
Asian Games bronze medalists for South Korea
Asian Games medalists in fencing
Medalists at the 2014 Asian Games
Medalists at the 2018 Asian Games
World Fencing Championships medalists